Limnonectes dammermani, Dammerman's wart frog, is a species of frogs in the family Dicroglossidae endemic to the Lesser Sunda Islands of Indonesia, where it can be found on Flores, Sumbawa, and Lombok.  It is believed to be a relatively common species that lives near forested streams, as other members of the genus do.

References

dammermani
Amphibians of Indonesia
Endemic fauna of Indonesia
Amphibians described in 1929
Taxonomy articles created by Polbot